Three conflicts during the Sri Lankan Civil War were known as the Battle of Elephant Pass:
First Battle of Elephant Pass, fought in July, 1991, for control of the Sri Lankan military base of Elephant Pass
Second Battle of Elephant Pass, fought in April, 2000, for control of the Sri Lankan military base of Elephant Pass
Third Battle of Elephant Pass, fought in January, 2009, for control of the Jaffna Peninsula